Suludere can refer to:

 Suludere, Alaca
 Suludere, Aydıntepe
 Suludere, Burdur